Fort Fincastle may refer to:

 Fort Henry (West Virginia), formerly called Fort Fincastle
 Fort Fincastle (Bahamas)